The 2009 European Parliament election in Belgium was on Sunday 7 June 2009 and was the election of the delegation from Belgium to the European Parliament. The elections were on the same day as regional elections to the Flemish Parliament, Walloon Parliament, Brussels Parliament and the Parliament of the German-speaking Community.

As a result of the Treaty of Nice – that became active in November 2004 – the number of Belgian delegates in the European Parliament decreased from 24 (in 2004) to 22 delegates: 13 delegates were elected by the Dutch-speaking Electoral College, 8 delegates by the Francophone Electoral College and 1 by the German-speaking Electoral College.

Results

Candidates

Dutch-speaking electoral college

Linguistic controversy

Brussels-Halle-Vilvoorde constituency 
Generally in Belgium, residents of Flanders can only vote for a party list that runs in Flanders, and in Wallonia residents may only pick a Walloon list. In practice this means residents will only be able to vote for a party representing the official language group of the region. (French-speakers in Flanders have, however, joined up in the cross-party Union des Francophones with one seat in the Flemish Parliament).

In the capital Brussels, which is officially bilingual, people can choose either a French- or a Dutch-speaking party list. However, the area surrounding Brussels is part of Dutch-speaking Flanders, but is joined with the Brussels constituency in elections for the European Parliament and the Belgian Parliament. This bilingual constituency, Brussels-Halle-Vilvoorde, has been declared unconstitutional and has been a source of controversy for years. Flemings fear the bilingual constituency leads to increased francisation of the Dutch-speaking area surrounding Brussels, while French-speakers claim it is their basic right to vote for a French-speaking party. Some Dutch-speaking municipalities decided to boycott the EU Parliament election for reason of the unconstitutionality, but elections were carried out anyway.

As in previous elections, Francophone parties campaigned outside of the Francophone area, leading to measures from Flemish authorities. Affligem and Halle are located in Dutch-speaking Flanders (although a substantial minority of Francophones also live there) but belong to the Brussels-Halle-Vilvoorde constituency. Politicians in Affligem and Halle have objected to French-speaking campaigners in Flanders, and billboard space has been denied by the municipal authorities. In Affligem, French-language posters that had already been put up were covered with white paper. The Francophone party Humanist Democratic Centre has condemned it as an attack on "the fundamental rights of French speakers on the periphery [of Brussels]".

The municipalities of Merchtem, Beersel, Kapelle-op-den-Bos, Machelen, Ternat, Meise, and Grimbergen also said that they would not provide billboard space, in the hope of avoiding French-language posters. In Steenokkerzeel, Ternat, and Grimbergen stickers were distributed, to be placed on mailboxes, requesting that only Dutch flyers are accepted.

References

External links
 European Parliament Elections 2009 in Belgium
 European Elections results shown on Belgian cartogram
 European Election Results 2009

Belgium
European Parliament elections in Belgium
2009 elections in Belgium